Jack Carl Kiefer (January 25, 1924 – August 10, 1981) was an American mathematical statistician at Cornell University (1952 to 1979) and the University of California, Berkeley (1979 to 1981). His research interests included the optimal design of experiments, which was his major research area, as well as a wide variety of topics in mathematical statistics.

Biography 

Jack Kiefer was born in Cincinnati, Ohio, to Carl Jack Kiefer and Marguerite K. Rosenau. He began his undergraduate studies at the Massachusetts Institute of Technology in 1942, but left after one year, taking up a position as first lieutenant in the United States Air Force during World War II. In 1946, he returned to MIT, graduating with bachelor's and master's degrees in economics and engineering in 1948 under the supervision of Harold Freeman. He then began graduate studies at Columbia University, under the supervision of Abraham Wald and Jacob Wolfowitz, receiving his Ph.D. in mathematical statistics in 1952. While still a graduate student, he began teaching at Cornell University, remaining there until 1979, when he retired from Cornell and accepted a new position as Miller Research Professor in the Department of Statistics and Mathematics at the University of California, Berkeley. In 1957, he married Dooley Sciple, a former undergraduate student of his at Cornell, with whom he had two children. Kiefer died of a heart attack in Berkeley, California on August 10, 1981.

Awards and honors 

Kiefer was a Fellow of the American Statistical Association and of the Institute of Mathematical Statistics, a member of the American Academy of Arts and Sciences (elected 1972) and of the United States National Academy of Sciences (elected 1975). From 1969–1970 he was president of the Institute of Mathematical Statistics.  In 1973, Kiefer and Michael Fisher were the first two Cornell faculty elected as Horace White Professors.

Contributions 

Much of Kiefer's research was on the design of experiments; the American Statistician obituary calls him "undoubtedly the foremost worker in optimal experimental design". However, he also made significant contributions to other areas of statistics and optimization, including the introduction of golden section search (his master's thesis work) the Dvoretzky–Kiefer–Wolfowitz inequality and the Bahadur-Ghosh-Kiefer representation (with R. R. Bahadur and J. K. Ghosh).

See also
Kiefer–Wolfowitz algorithm
Hoeffding's independence test
Strong subadditivity of quantum entropy
Information-based complexity

Notes

References 
.
. Reviewed in Biometrics 43 (1): 257.
.

.
.
.

Presidents of the Institute of Mathematical Statistics
Fellows of the American Statistical Association
Fellows of the Institute of Mathematical Statistics
American statisticians
Cornell University faculty
University of California, Berkeley College of Letters and Science faculty
Columbia Graduate School of Arts and Sciences alumni
Massachusetts Institute of Technology alumni
1924 births
1981 deaths
Members of the United States National Academy of Sciences
20th-century American mathematicians
Mathematical statisticians
Deaths from heart disease
People from Cincinnati